Fisksätra is a locality situated in Nacka Municipality, Stockholm County, Sweden with 7,475 inhabitants in 2010. Built in the 1970s during the Million programme, it has inhabitants from 70 different nationalities.

References 

Populated places in Nacka Municipality